Skærbæk is a railway town, with a population of 3,135 (1 January 2022), in Tønder Municipality, Region of Southern Denmark on the Jutland peninsula in south Denmark.

Skærbæk was the municipal seat of the former Skærbæk Municipality, until 1 January 2007.

Skærbæk Church

Skærbæk Church is first mentioned in the sources in 1292 and it is then said that it is dedicated to St. Simon and Skt. Judas (son of Jacob).

Notable people

 Jeppe Prætorius (1745-1823) a Danish merchant and shipowner, was born in Skærbæk. 

 Jannik Petersen Bjerrum (1851-1920) a Danish ophthalmologist, was born in Skærbæk

 Kirstine Meyer (1861-1941) a Danish physicist, was born in Skærbæk.

 The former professional footballer Kenneth Fabricius is born in Skærbæk.

References

Cities and towns in the Region of Southern Denmark
Tønder Municipality